Maronas is an abandoned village in the Paphos District of Cyprus, located 3 km north of Archimandrita. 
It was likely named after Saint Maron.

References

Communities in Paphos District